Sir Geoffrey James Warnock (16 August 19238 October 1995) was an English philosopher and Vice-Chancellor of Oxford University. Before his knighthood (in the 1986 New Year Honours), he was commonly known as G. J. Warnock.

Life 
Warnock was born at Neville House, Chapel Allerton, Leeds, West Yorkshire, to James Warnock (1880–1953), OBE, a general practitioner from Northern Ireland who had been a Captain in the Royal Army Medical Corps, and Kathleen (née Hall; 1890–1979). The Warnocks later lived at Grade II-listed Pull Croft, Sutton Courtenay, Oxfordshire (historically Berkshire).

Warnock was educated at Winchester College. He then served with the Irish Guards until 1945, before entering New College, Oxford, with a classics scholarship. He was elected to a Fellowship at Magdalen College, Oxford, in 1949. After spending three years at Brasenose College, he returned to Magdalen as a Fellow and tutor in philosophy. In 1970, he was elected to Principal of Hertford College, Oxford (1971–1988), where there is now a society and student house named after him. He was also the Vice-Chancellor of the University of Oxford from 1981 to 1985.

Warnock, with co-editor J. O. Urmson, prepared for posthumous 1961 publication the Philosophical Papers of their friend, and fellow Oxford linguistic philosopher, J. L. Austin. Warnock also reconstructed Austin's Sense and Sensibilia (1962) from manuscript notes. 

Warnock married Mary Wilson, a fellow philosopher of St Hugh's College, Oxford, and later Baroness Warnock, in 1949. They had two sons and three daughters. He retired to live near Marlborough, Wiltshire, in 1988 and died of degenerative lung disease in 1995 at Axford in Wiltshire.

Works
For a more complete list of Warnock's works see his PhilPapers entry

 Berkeley, Penguin Books, 1953.

English Philosophy Since 1900, 1st edition, Oxford University Press, 1958; 2nd edition, Oxford University Press, 1969.
Contemporary Moral Philosophy (New studies in ethics), Palgrave Macmillan, 1967. .
The Object of Morality, Methuen, 1971. .
Morality and Language, Barnes & Noble. 1983
J. L. Austin (The Arguments of the Philosophers), Routledge, 1989.

References

External links
 Discussion with Bryan Magee
Behaviour control: freedom and morality (video) Warnock in discussion with B. F Skinner and host Godfrey Vesey (Open University, 1972)
Photograph of Geoffrey and Mary Warnock by Steve Pyke
Obituary in The Independent by Patrick Gardiner, and another obituary in the same newspaper by John Torrance]
The Primacy of Practical Reason by G J Warnock (1967 Dawes Hicks Lecture on Philosophy)

1923 births
1995 deaths
20th-century English historians
Alumni of New College, Oxford
Analytic philosophers
Fellows of Brasenose College, Oxford
Fellows of Magdalen College, Oxford
George Berkeley scholars
Knights Bachelor
People educated at Winchester College
People from Chapel Allerton
Philosophers of education
Philosophers of history
Principals of Hertford College, Oxford
Spouses of life peers
Vice-Chancellors of the University of Oxford
20th-century English philosophers
British Army personnel of World War II
Irish Guards soldiers